The following is a list of shoegaze musicians.

Artists

See also
List of dream pop artists
List of post-rock bands
List of post-metal bands
List of neo-psychedelia artists
List of noise rock bands
List of ambient music artists

References

Shoegazing